Indian Point is a village in Stone County, Missouri, United States. The population was 550 at the 2020 census. It is part of the Branson, Missouri Micropolitan Statistical Area.

Geography
Indian Point is located at  (36.636770, -93.346997).

Indian Point is home to a popular theme park, "Silver Dollar City", and numerous resorts serving the Branson area.

Demographics

2010 census
As of the census of 2010, there were 528 people, 243 households, and 159 families residing in the village. The racial makeup of the village was 96.4% White, 1.3% Native American, 0.2% Asian, 0.6% from other races, and 1.5% from two or more races. Hispanic or Latino of any race were 2.1% of the population.

There were 243 households, of which 16.9% had children under the age of 18 living with them, 56.8% were married couples living together, 5.3% had a female householder with no husband present, 3.3% had a male householder with no wife present, and 34.6% were non-families. 25.9% of all households were made up of individuals, and 11.6% had someone living alone who was 65 years of age or older. The average household size was 2.17 and the average family size was 2.60.

The median age in the village was 56 years. 12.9% of residents were under the age of 18; 4.7% were between the ages of 18 and 24; 15.3% were from 25 to 44; 37.5% were from 45 to 64; and 29.5% were 65 years of age or older. The gender makeup of the village was 52.3% male and 47.7% female.

2000 census
As of the census of 2000, there were 588 people, 253 households, and 193 families residing in the village. The population density was 210.5 people per square mile (81.4/km2). There were 463 housing units at an average density of 165.7 per square mile (64.1/km2). The racial makeup of the village was 99.32% White, 0.17% Native American, 0.17% Asian, and 0.34% from two or more races. Hispanic or Latino persons of any race were 2.38% of the population.

There were 253 households, out of which 20.9% had children under the age of 18 living with them, 64.8% were married couples living together, 9.1% had a female householder with no husband present, and 23.7% were non-families. 18.6% of all households were made up of individuals, and 7.5% had someone living alone who was 65 years of age or older. The average household size was 2.32 and the average family size was 2.61.

In the village, the population was spread out, with 17.2% under the age of 18, 8.8% from 18 to 24, 23.6% from 25 to 44, 32.7% from 45 to 64, and 17.7% who were 65 years of age or older. The median age was 45 years. For every 100 females, there were 90.9 males. For every 100 females age 18 and over, there were 86.6 males.

The median income for a household in the village was $37,727, and the median income for a family was $42,250. Males had a median income of $31,429 versus $20,156 for females. The per capita income for the village was $18,987. About 2.2% of families and 5.9% of the population were below the poverty line, including none of those under age 18 and 2.1% of those age 65 or over.

Campground

Overview 
Indian Point is a campground on the White River Arm of Table Rock Lake in the mountainous Missouri countryside.

Table Rock Lake is a body of water surrounded by a forest of oak and hickory trees. Its waters wind down through the valleys and hollows of the Ozark Mountains, from Branson, Missouri to Eureka Springs, Arkansas.

More than five million visitors per year take advantage of this recreational area. Originally built for flood control, the Table Rock Dam has created a lake that has 779 miles of shoreline.

Recreational activities at the park include swimming, scuba diving, boating, fishing, hunting, hiking and wildlife viewing. 

While the lake also has crappie, catfish, and bluegill, Table Rock is best known for bass, and is acclaimed as one of the best bass fishing lakes in the hemisphere.

Table Rock Lakeshore Trail, about 2 miles long, runs from the Dewey Short Visitor Center to the Table Rock State Park Marina. During the spring hikers can see dogwood, serviceberry and redbud trees in bloom as well as wildflower species. 

Other hiking and mountain biking opportunities are available at the Mark Twain National Forest, parts of which are accessible from the campground.

Facilities 

Indian Point Campground has 76 reservable campsites, along with two large reservable group picnic shelters. Amenities include hot showers, drinking water, a dump station and electric hookups.

There is also a beach, boat ramp and playground.

Nearby Attractions 

The Dewey Short Visitors Center is located at the south end of Table Rock Dam. It presents three educational films focused on the history of the dam, the story of Lewis and Clark and the history of eagles and their endangerment in the state of Missouri.

The visitor center also contains exhibits about the natural history of the area. Visitors arriving by boat can use the courtesy dock.

Indian Point Campground is about 8 miles from Branson, Missouri.

References

Villages in Stone County, Missouri
Branson, Missouri micropolitan area
Villages in Missouri
Populated places established in 1989